Vojtěch Adam (born 12 September 1950) is a Czech politician. He was a member of the Chamber of Deputies of the Czech Republic from 2008 to 2017, representing Southern Moravia for the Communist Party of Bohemia and Moravia

Career
He has served as a member of Committee on Health Care and a member of the Committee on Public Administration and Regional Development since December 2013.

References

Living people
1950 births
People from Ivančice
Communist Party of Bohemia and Moravia MPs
Czech communists
Members of the Chamber of Deputies of the Czech Republic (2006–2010)
Members of the Chamber of Deputies of the Czech Republic (2010–2013)
Members of the Chamber of Deputies of the Czech Republic (2013–2017)
Masaryk University alumni